Kazi Md. Anowar Hossain (1955–2017) is a Jatiya Party (Ershad) politician and the former Member of Parliament of Brahmanbaria-5.

Career
Hossain was elected to parliament from Brahmanbaria-5 as a Jatiya Party candidate in 1986, 1988, 1991, and 2001.

Death 
Kazi Md. Anowar Hossain died on 3 March 2017 in Apollo Hospital Dhaka, Bangladesh.

References

Bangladesh Nationalist Party politicians
3rd Jatiya Sangsad members
4th Jatiya Sangsad members
5th Jatiya Sangsad members
8th Jatiya Sangsad members
People from Brahmanbaria district
1955 births
2017 deaths